Adolf Oliverson Indrebø (7 February 1884 – 5 December 1942) was a Norwegian politician for the Labour Party.

He hailed from Førde, but moved to Oslo as a student. He was a member of Oslo city council from 1917 to 1934, serving as mayor from 1929 to 1931.

In 1935, during the cabinet Nygaardsvold, he was appointed Minister of Finance. He held this post one year. He was also head of the Ministry of Defense, briefly in 1935.

References

Adolf Indrebø at NRK Sogn og Fjordane County Encyclopedia 

1884 births
1942 deaths
People from Førde
Ministers of Finance of Norway
Mayors of Oslo
Labour Party (Norway) politicians
Place of death missing